Dusun Deyah, or Deyah, is a language spoken by a group of Dusun people of South Kalimantan province, Indonesia. It is spoken in Tabalong Regency across two districts: Haruai, in the villages of Kinarum, Kaong, Pangelak, and Bilas, and Muara Uya, especially in the village of Mangkopom.

References

Further reading 

 

East Barito languages
Languages of Indonesia